Maksym Melnychuk (born 18 September 1999) is a Ukrainian professional footballer who plays as a defender for Vorskla Poltava in the Ukrainian Premier League.

Career
Melnychuk is a product of the RVUFK and Dynamo Kyiv youth sportive schools.

In July 2018 he continued his career in the Ukrainian Premier League Reserves club FC Vorskla Poltava. And in September 2019 Melnychuk was promoted to the main-squad team of FC Vorskla in the Ukrainian Premier League. He made his debut as a start-squad player for Vorskla Poltava in the Ukrainian Premier League in a losing match against FC Olimpik Donetsk on 20 October 2019.

International career
During 2014–2015 he was called up for the youth national representation under 16.

References

External links
 

1999 births
Living people
Footballers from Kyiv
Ukrainian footballers
Association football defenders
FC Vorskla Poltava players
FC Chornomorets Odesa players
FC Inhulets Petrove players
Ukrainian Premier League players
Ukraine youth international footballers